Benito Totti (May 10, 1914 – 1940) was an Italian boxer who competed in the 1936 Summer Olympics.

In 1936 he was eliminated in the second round of the middleweight class after losing his fight to Adolf Baumgarten.

External links
Benito Totti's profile at Sports Reference.com
Report on Italian Olympic boxers 

1914 births
1940 deaths
Middleweight boxers
Olympic boxers of Italy
Boxers at the 1936 Summer Olympics
Italian male boxers